Wilson is a male first name. Notable people with the name include:

People
Wilson Ruffin Abbott (1801–1876), Canadian businessman
Wilson Asinobi Ake (born 1955), Nigerian politician
Wilson Alcorro (born 1973), Colombian boxer
Wilson Álvarez (born 1970), Venezuelan baseball player
Wilson Alvarez (American football) (born 1957), Bolivian football player
Wilson Francisco Alves (1927–1998), Brazilian football player
Wilson Antônio (born 1982), Brazilian football player
Wilson Baker (1900–2002), British organic chemist
Wilson Barrett (1846–1904), British actor and theater manager
Wilson Bell (1897–1947), American politician
Wilson Benge (1875–1955), British actor
Wilson Bentley (1865–1931), American photographer and meteorologist
Wilson Betemit (born 1981), Dominican baseball player
Wilson Bigaud (1931–2010), Haitian painter
Wilson S. Bissell (1847–1903), American politician
Wilson Brown (admiral) (1882–1957), American admiral
Wilson Brown (Medal of Honor) (1841–1900), American sailor
Wilson Busienei (born 1981), Ugandan long-distance runner
Wilson Caldwell (1841–1898), American university officer
Wilson Carlile (1847–1942), British evangelist
Wilson Casey (born 1954), American writer
Wilson Chandler (born 1987), American basketball player
Wilson Cooke (1819 –1887), American politician and merchant
Wilson Cruz (born 1973), American actor
Wilson Delgado (born 1972), Dominican baseball player
Wilson C. Edsell (1814–1900), American politician
Wilson Frost (1925–2018), American lawyer and politician
Wilson Goode (born 1938), Mayor of Philadelphia
Wilson Gunaratne (born 1949), Sri Lankan Sinhala cinema, TV, and stage actor
Wilson Harris (1921–2018), Guyanese writer
Wilson A. Head (1914–1993), American sociologist
Wilson Heredia (born 1972), Dominican baseball player
Wilson Jermaine Heredia (born 1971), American actor
Wilson Jameson (1885–1962), British doctor
Wilson Roosevelt Jerman (1929-2020), American butler; served in the White House
Wilson Jones (billiards player) (1922–2003), Indian billiards player
Wilson Jones (footballer) (1914–1986), British football player
Wilson Karunaratne (1942–2022), Sri Lankan Sinhala film actor and stunt director
Wilson Bryan Key (1925–2008), American author
Wilson Kipketer (born 1972), Danish middle-distance runner
Wilson Boit Kipketer (born 1973), Kenyan athlete
Wilson Ko (born 1960), American cardiothoracic surgeon
Wilson MacDonald (1880–1967), Canadian poet 
Wilson Carey McWilliams (1933–2005), American political scientist
Wilson Cary Nicholas (1761–1820), American politician
Wilson Palacios (born 1984), Honduran footballer
Koddul Arachchige Wilson Perera (1926-2006), Sri Lankan Sinhala director
Wilson Raj Perumal (born 1965), Singaporean match-fixer and bookmaker
Wilson Pickett (1941–2006), American singer and songwriter
Wilson Riles (1917–1999), American educator
Wilson Tucker (writer) (1914–2006), American writer
Wilson Valdez (born 1978), Dominican baseball player
Wilson Whineray (1935–2012), New Zealand rugby player
Wilson Yip (born 1963), Hong Kong actor

Fictional characters
Wilson, a character from Phish lore
Wilson Fisk, a crime lord known as the Kingpin
Wilson the Volleyball, from the film Cast Away
Wilson Wilson Jr, home improvement
Wilson, a playable character from Don't Starve.

See also

List of people with surname Wilson
Wilson (name)
Wilson (disambiguation)

References

Wilson